Waleska Crespo Rivera is a Puerto Rican businessperson and academic administrator. She is president of Universidad Central del Caribe.

Education 
Crespo Rivera completed a bachelor's degree and internship in Nutrition and Dietetics with a focus in diabetes and obesity management at University of Puerto Rico, Río Piedras Campus. In 2000, she completed a master's degree health services management and administration (MHSA) at University of Puerto Rico, Medical Sciences Campus (UPR-RCM) where she also completed a doctor of public health (DPH) with a focus on health services management and administration.

Career 
Crespo Rivera was the executive director and chief executive officer of the Cardiovascular Center for Puerto Rico and the Caribbean. She was an adjunct professor in health services administration at University of Puerto Rico, Medical Sciences Campus. She served on the board of the Puerto Rico Hospital Association, Puerto Rico Comprehensive Cancer Center, and the Puerto Rico Medical Tourism Corporation. Crespo Rivera was the executive director of Healthsouth Rehabilitation Hospital in Manatí, Puerto Rico and an administrator at the Hospital Hermanos Meléndez. In February 2018, she became president of the Universidad Central del Caribe, succeeding her predecessor José Ginel Rodríguez.

See also 

 List of women presidents or chancellors of co-ed colleges and universities

References 

Living people
Year of birth missing (living people)
21st-century Puerto Rican educators
Women heads of universities and colleges
Heads of universities and colleges in the United States
Place of birth missing (living people)
University of Puerto Rico, Río Piedras Campus alumni
Puerto Rican business executives
American women chief executives
Puerto Rican women in business
21st-century American businesswomen
21st-century American businesspeople
American health care chief executives
21st-century American women educators
21st-century American educators